Edward L. Dexter (July 28, 1922 – January 25, 2001) was an American politician from Maine. A Republican from Kingfield, Dexter served in the Maine House of Representatives from 1977 to 1990 again from 1993 to 1998. In 1998, he was defeated for re-election by Monica McGlocklin of Embden. He unsuccessfully sought to return to the legislature again in 2000.

References

1922 births
2001 deaths
Republican Party members of the Maine House of Representatives
People from Kingfield, Maine
20th-century American politicians